The Sasseneire is a mountain of the Swiss Pennine Alps, overlooking Evolène in the canton of Valais. It lies on the range between the valleys of Hérens and Anniviers.

Climbing routes
Normal mountaineering routes to Sasseneire are from Val de Moiry on the east and from Val d’Herens on the west. Both routes lead to Col de Torrent which is at 2916 m above the sea level. A very convenient start point is the dam at the Moiry lake, with the car access and with the bus service from Grimentz. You need 2.5 hours from the dam to the Col  de Torrent.

It takes approximately one hour from the Col to the summit by following the ridge in a northerly direction. There are no exposed sections in any part of the route.

References

External links 
 Sasseneire at mountainsforeverybody.com

Mountains of the Alps
Alpine three-thousanders
Mountains of Valais
Mountains of Switzerland